Ammoniphilus oxalivorans is a Gram-variable, spore-forming, haloalkalitolerant, rod-shaped, aerobic, obligately oxalotrophic and motile bacteria from the genus of Ammoniphilus with peritrichous flagella which has been isolated from the rhizosphere of the plant Rumex acetosa from a public garden in Helsinki in Finland.

References

Further reading

External links
Type strain of Ammoniphilus oxalivorans at BacDive -  the Bacterial Diversity Metadatabase	

Paenibacillaceae
Bacteria described in 1998